Rana Mashood Ahmad Khan is a Pakistani politician and lawyer who had been the member of the Provincial Assembly of the Punjab from 2002 to May 2018 and from August 2018 to January 2023. He served as the deputy speaker of the Punjab Assembly from 2008 to 2013 and Secretary Lahore High Court Bar Association.

Early life and education
He was born on 26 August 1966 in Lahore.

He received the degree  of LL. B.  Bachelor of Laws  in 1991 from Punjab Law College. He also has a degree of Bachelor of Arts, which he got from University of the Punjab.

Political career
 
He was elected to the Provincial Assembly of the Punjab as a candidate of Pakistan Muslim League (N) (PML-N) from Constituency PP-149 (Lahore-XIII) in 2002 Pakistani general election. He received 13,300 votes and defeated a candidate of Pakistan Muslim League (Q).

He was re-elected to the Provincial Assembly of the Punjab as a candidate of PML-N from Constituency PP-149 (Lahore-XIII) in 2008 Pakistani general election. He received 36,212 votes and defeated Pir Syed Nazim Hussain Shah, a candidate of Pakistan Peoples Party. He was elected as Deputy Speaker of Punjab Assembly in April 2008 where he served until 2013.

He was re-elected to the Provincial Assembly of the Punjab as a candidate of PML-N from Constituency PP-149 (Lahore-XIII) in 2013 Pakistani general election. In June 2013, he was inducted into the provincial cabinet of Chief Minister Shehbaz Sharif and was made the provincial minister for school education with additional charge of higher education and youth affairs, sports, archaeology and tourism. He was given additional ministerial portfolio of law and parliamentary affairs in June 2014 where he served under October 2014. In a cabinet reshuffle in November 2016, he was made the provincial minister for school education.

He was re-elected to Provincial Assembly of the Punjab as a candidate of PML-N from Constituency PP-152 (Lahore-IX) in 2018 Pakistani general election.

References

Deputy Speakers of the Provincial Assembly of the Punjab
Living people
1966 births
Pakistan Muslim League (N) MPAs (Punjab)
Politicians from Lahore
Punjab MPAs 2013–2018
Punjab MPAs 2008–2013
Punjab MPAs 2002–2007
Punjab MPAs 2018–2023
Punjabi people
University of the Punjab alumni
People from Lahore